GitoGito Hustler (ギトギトハスラ→ in Japanese; also spelled Gitogito Hustler) is a Japanese all-female punk rock band.

The four-member group was formed in 1995 in Kyoto, Japan and is now based in Tokyo.  Members include Yago (vocals and guitar), Mitsuko (guitar), Tae (bass guitar), and Fusa (drums).  Yago and Fusa are sisters, and Fusa is the younger of the two. Tae resigned the group in 2008. GitoGito Hustler's recordings are released by Gearhead Records.  They have toured Japan and the United States multiple times.

References

External links
GitoGito Hustler MySpace page
Gito Feature on SailorJerry.com
Gito Gito Page at gearheadrecords.com

All-female punk bands
Riot grrrl bands
Japanese punk rock groups
Garage punk groups
Musical groups established in 1995
Japanese indie rock groups
Musical groups from Kyoto Prefecture
Gearhead Records artists